Kokhanov is a Russian surname. Notable people with the surname include:

 Alexey Kokhanov (born 1981), singer, sound artist, and composer based in Moscow and Berlin

See also
 

Russian-language surnames